Conyngham Township is the name of some places in the U.S. state of Pennsylvania:
Conyngham Township, Columbia County, Pennsylvania
Conyngham Township, Luzerne County, Pennsylvania

Pennsylvania township disambiguation pages